European route E 932 is a European B class road in Italy, connecting the hamlet of Buonfornello (in the municipality of Termini Imerese) and Catania.

Route 
 
 Buonfornello
 Catania

External links 
 UN Economic Commission for Europe: Overall Map of E-road Network (2007)
 International E-road network

International E-road network
Roads in Italy